Žarko Belada (Cyrillic: Жарко Белада, born 10 June 1977) is a Montenegrin retired footballer.

Club career
Born in Cetinje (SR Montenegro, SFR Yugoslavia), he had started his career by playing with the local club FK Lovćen in 1992. After already becoming a senior he will move to FK Mogren in 1997, before joining FK Vojvodina in 2000.  He will also have a loan spell with FK Kabel before moving to Polish Ekstraklasa side Wisła Płock. He moved back to Mogren during the winter break of the 2008–09 season, and will play in the Montenegrin First League with his former side FK Lovćen since 2010. In 2012 will play in the Montenegrin Second League for FK Cetinje.

International career
He played for the FR Yugoslavia national under-21 football team.

Honours
Wisła Płock
Polish Cup: 2005-06
Polish Supercup: 2006-07
Mogren
Montenegrin First League: 2008-09

References

1977 births
Living people
Sportspeople from Cetinje
Association football central defenders
Serbia and Montenegro footballers
Serbia and Montenegro under-21 international footballers
Montenegrin footballers
FK Lovćen players
FK Mogren players
FK Vojvodina players
FK Kabel players
Wisła Płock players
FK Cetinje players
Montenegrin First League players
Ekstraklasa players
Montenegrin Second League players
Montenegrin expatriate footballers
Expatriate footballers in Poland
Montenegrin expatriate sportspeople in Poland